The Institut national de l'image et du son (INIS) National Institute College of Image and Sound is a training institute for film, television and interactive media creation located in Montreal, Quebec. The institute was incorporated as a non-profit organization in 1990 and began operations in 1996.

INIS is located adjacent to the Cinémathèque québécoise. As of 2002, its operating budget was reported to be $3.2 million, with half supplied by the film industry and half from the Quebec and Canadian governments.

It was founded by Quebec filmmaker Fernand Dansereau.

References

External links
School website 

Universities and colleges in Montreal
Cinema of Quebec
Film schools in Canada
Educational institutions established in 1990
Private colleges in Quebec
Culture of Montreal
Ville-Marie, Montreal
1990 establishments in Canada